Iolaus iulus, the Iulus sapphire, is a butterfly in the family Lycaenidae. It is found in Senegal (Basse Casamance), Sierra Leone, Liberia, Ivory Coast, Ghana, Togo, southern Nigeria, Cameroon, Gabon, the Republic of the Congo, the Democratic Republic of the Congo, Uganda and Zambia. The habitat consists of forests and cleared lands.

Adults have been recorded feeding from flowers. During the dry season, both sexes mud-puddle.

The larvae feed on the flowers of Loranthus incanus, Globimetula braunii, Globimetula mweroensis, Tapinanthus erianthus and Englerina woodfordioides. They are associated with the ant species Crematogaster buchneri. The larvae are predominantly ruby and green in colour.

References

External links

Die Gross-Schmetterlinge der Erde 13: Die Afrikanischen Tagfalter. Plate XIII 67 d

Butterflies described in 1869
Iolaus (butterfly)
Butterflies of Africa
Taxa named by William Chapman Hewitson